The Galaxy Food Centers 300 was a NASCAR Busch Series stock car race held at Hickory Motor Speedway, a  paved oval track located in Hickory, North Carolina. One of the inaugural events of the Busch Series from its 1982 season, it was one of five races the series ran at the track in 1982, four from 1983 to 1985, three in 1986 and, from 1987 to 1994, was the series' first of two annual visits to the track; from 1995 to 1998 it was the only visit to the track by the series annually. until Hickory Motor Speedway departed the series schedule after the 1998 season. The race distance was 300 laps in 1982 and from 1992 to 1998, 200 laps from 1983 to 1990, and 276 laps in 1992.

Jack Ingram won the event three times, the most of any driver; his 1987 victory in the race would prove to be the final win of his Busch Series career. Tommy Houston won the event twice, his victory in 1992 being the final win of his Busch Series career. The 1992 running of the event was marred by track damage from poorly cured asphalt, resulting in 132 of the race's 300 laps being run under the yellow flag; both the number of caution laps and the 26 caution periods set all-time NASCAR records. Jimmy Spencer scored his first career Busch Series victory in the 1989 Mountain Dew 400; the final running of the race, the 1998 Galaxy Food Centers 300, was the first and only career Busch Series victory for Ed Berrier.

Past winners

References

External links
 

1982 establishments in North Carolina
1998 disestablishments in North Carolina
Former NASCAR races
NASCAR Xfinity Series races
NASCAR races at Hickory Motor Speedway
Recurring events disestablished in 1998
Recurring sporting events established in 1982